Dalian Maritime University is a university located in Dalian, Liaoning, China.  It is a key maritime institution under the Ministry of Transport of the People's Republic of China, and is a Chinese state Double First Class University Plan university identified by the Ministry of Education.

History 
The long history of the university can be traced back to 1909, when the Nanyang Institute in Shanghai established a Shipping Management Section.  DMU was founded in 1953 through the merger of three merchant marine institutions: Shanghai Nautical College, the Northeast Navigation College and Fujian Navigation School. At the time its name was Dalian Marine College, and it was the only maritime college in China. In 1960, DMU was designated a national key institution of higher education. Later in 1983, the Asia-Pacific Region Maritime Training Center was established at DMU by the United Nations Development Program (UNDP) and the IMO, and in 1985, a branch of the World Maritime University (WMU) was established.

In 1994 the university's name was changed to the present one.

On June 6, 2009, DMU celebrated its centennial, with vice chairman of standing committee of 11th National People's Congress Chen Zhili as the main guest.

Facilities 
DMU is located in southwestern Dalian. The university covers an area of 1.13 million square meters with about half a million square meters occupied by buildings. DMU has a training dock and over 40 laboratories for teaching, training and research. DMU also owns and operates an ocean-going training vessel of over 10,000 deadweight tonnage.

Academics 
The university is designated as one of the "Project 211" institutions. Only about six percent of the universities across China were selected in this project. The university consists of 14 colleges and Departments: 
 Navigation
 Marine engineering
 School of Law
 Information Science and Technology College
 Transportation Management College
 Transportation & Logistics Engineering College
 Environmental Science and Engineering College
 Humanities and Social Sciences College
 School of Foreign Languages
 Department of Mathematics
 Department of Physics
 Department of Physical Education
 Specialized Degree College
 Continuing Education College

Currently DMU has 42 undergraduate programs, 2 first-class doctoral programs, 12 second-class doctoral programs, 7 first-class master's degree programs and 59 second-class master's degree programs. Transport Engineering first-class discipline has a post-doctoral R&D base.  The university is authorized to confer MBA, MPA, J.M., and Master of Engineering, an on-the-job master's degree.

The current student population has risen to approximately 17,000. Additionally, DMU enrolls overseas students for bachelor's and master's degrees and PhDs. More than 4,000 overseas students and advanced professionals from over 30 countries and regions have been educated and trained at DMU.

DMU has an academic agreement with 4 academicians from the National Academy of Engineering, 39 chair professors, and 148 visiting professors.

Cooperative relations 
Since 1979 when the reform and open-door policy started, DMU has established cooperative relations with more than 20 internationally renowned maritime institutions like the International Maritime Organization (IMO), the International Labour Organization (ILO), the International Association of Maritime Universities (IAMU), the Association of the Maritime Education and Training Institutes in Asia Pacific (AMETIAP), the International Maritime Lecturers Association (IMLA), Asia-Pacific Economic Cooperation (APEC), the Association of Southeast Asian Nations (ASEAN), the International Shipping Federation (ISF), the International Association of Classification Societies (IACS), as well as some world famous shipping companies.

Recently, there are about 40 students from China and the Southeast Asian countries who are studying at DMU in English under the World Maritime University scholarship, to earn the master's degrees in 14 months.

Dalian Government Scholarships 
Dalian government offers a number of scholarships to international students who want to pursue higher education at Dalian Maritime University
 New Undergraduate Student Scholarship
 Outstanding Undergraduate Student Scholarship
 Outstanding Graduate Student Scholarship
 Language Study Scholarship
 Language Study Full Attendance Scholarship

Notable alumni 
 Li Shengling
 Si Yuzhuo
 Wei Jiafu
 Chen Zhenggao
 Qian Yongchang
 Liu Gongcheng
 Liu Chuanhai
 Jin Yan

See also
Chinese shipping
Shanghai Maritime University

References

 
Universities and colleges in Dalian
Maritime colleges in China
Project 211
Educational institutions established in 1909
1909 establishments in China